Killer Image is a 1992 independent Canadian suspense film directed by David Winning. It stars Michael Ironside and John Pyper-Ferguson. The story centers on two brothers, one a powerful senator, one a ruthless killer.  A photographer captures images of the politician in a compromising position and is murdered.  Now his brother has discovered the film and wants vengeance.

Plot synopsis
When Max Oliver (John Pyper-Ferguson) learns his photographer brother has been killed, he suspects it was no random murder. And when he finds his brothers' last photos of a powerful senator (M. Emmet Walsh) and a prostitute, Max gets a clear picture of a deadly political cover-up. Seeking to expose his brother's killer, Max enters a murderous game of cat and mouse, stalked by a cold-blooded assassin (Michael Ironside) who has Max dead in his sights.

Cast
 Michael Ironside as Luther Kane
 John Pyper-Ferguson as Max Oliver
 Krista Errickson as Shelley
 M. Emmet Walsh as Senator John Kane
 Paul Austin as Ric Oliver
 Chantelle Jenkins as Lori

Production
The film was shot in the September and October 1990 in locations in and around Calgary, Alberta.  Production took 20 days. Malofilm, a distributor from Montreal, and Pierre David, in Los Angeles, were partially funding the project, along with seed-money from the Alberta government.  The film was released in Canada and the United States in 1992, being distributed by Malofilm, but did not receive a home video release until the early 1993 thru Paramount Home Video and received its US premiere as a finalist at the 1992 Houston Film Festival.

Reception
The Calgary Herald published a review in March 1992 that said David Winning’s sharp stylish exploitation movie, is a triumph of first-rate technique over less than first-rate content.  Chuck O’Leary on Rotten Tomatoes called it an implausible B thriller made watchable by Michael Ironside's portrayal of another clenched-jawed psycho.

References

External links

1992 films
1990s thriller films
Canadian thriller films
English-language Canadian films
Films directed by David Winning
Films set in Canada
Canadian independent films
1990s English-language films
1990s Canadian films